The 70th Infantry Division was a unit of the German Army during World War II. It was formed late in 1944 from personnel previously exempted from military service due to stomach disorders or injuries (sometimes referred to as a "Stomach division").

History
As World War II progressed, German manpower available for military service declined and this was exacerbated by the severe losses suffered in Normandy, Tunisia and Stalingrad, for example. Groups of men, previously declared unfit for active service, were drafted or recalled into service. These included those with stomach complaints and it was decided that these men would be concentrated into one formation to facilitate the provision of special foods and to isolate infectious or unpleasant conditions (hence the unofficial description of "White Bread" or Magen (Stomach) Division).

In August, 1944, the Division garrisoned Walcheren Island and South Beveland and in October consolidated on Walcheren during the assault by the II Canadian Corps. Although not a first-class formation, the 70th was installed in static defences and supported by ample heavy artillery, held out for several days. The Division, left with no escape route from Walcheren, surrendered on 5 November 1944 and 10,000 Germans became prisoners of war.

Later, during the Battle of the Bulge, the Germans employed another "Stomach" unit, the Infantrie Ersatz und Ausbildungs Battaillon 282 (M), referred to as "Stomach Trouble Battalion 282" by the 749th Tank Battalion.

Order of battle
The Divisional commander was Generalleutnant Wilhelm Daser.

Structure of the division: 
 1018th Grenadier Regiment (1018. Grenadier-Regiment)
 1019th Grenadier Regiment (1019. Grenadier-Regiment)
 1020th Grenadier Regiment (1020. Grenadier-Regiment)
 170th Artillery Regiment (170. Artillerie-Regiment)
 170th Fusilier Battalion (70. Divisions-Füsilier-Bataillon)
 170th Tank Destroyer Company (170. Panzerjäger-Kompanie)
 170th Engineer Battalion (170. Pionier-Bataillon)
 170th Signal Detachment (170. Signalabtrennung)
 170th Field Replacement Battalion (170. Feldersatz-Bataillon)
 170th Divisional Supply Group (170. Divisionsversorgungsgruppe)

External links
 The Battle of the Scheldt September-November 1944

References

Military units and formations established in 1944
0*070
Military units and formations disestablished in 1944